Tejgaon Industrial Area Thana is a Thana of Dhaka District in the Division of Dhaka, Bangladesh that was formed in 2006.

See also
 Upazilas of Bangladesh
 Districts of Bangladesh
 Divisions of Bangladesh

References

Thanas of Dhaka
Neighbourhoods in Bangladesh